"The Killers" is a short-story by Charles Bukowski collected in his 1973 collection South of No North, originally published by John Martin's Black Sparrow Press. The story elucidates Bukowski's publicly acknowledged artistic debt to Ernest Hemingway, the writer who had the most influence on American writers of Bukowksi's generation. Like Hemingway's "The Killers", Bukowski's story of the same name has as its thematic trope murder in a nihilistic universe. Unlike Hemingway, the killers actually accomplish their act in the time-frame of the story. 

Bukowski's authorial point of view in his version of "The Killers" also is influenced by Hemingway, as he sees it as a logical outgrowth of the attitude expressed by Hemingway's fictional alter-ego Nick Adams at the end of the 1927 "Killers": 

Bukowski's fiction is full of attempts to escape the Los Angeles of his childhood and teen-years, all of which are doomed to failure as his fictional alter-ego, Henry Chinaski,  finds the same appalling corruption everywhere he travels. In Bukowski's "The Killers", there is no escape for the murderers who are the protagonists of the story, mirroring the doomed boxer Ole Andreson in Hemingway's original.

Works by Charles Bukowski
1973 short stories